The ISU World Synchronized Skating Championships (WSSC) are the world championships for the sport of synchronized skating. Held since 2000, the World Synchronized Skating Championships is an annual event organized by the International Skating Union and attracts the most elite senior-level synchronized skating teams from around the world to compete for the World Championship.

Since the beginning, the top positions have been mainly dominated by Sweden and Finland: the Swedish Team Surprise have won six World titles, four silver medals and one bronze medal and the Finnish Marigold IceUnity are five-time World Champions with six silver medals and two bronze medals. Rockettes from Finland have earned three World titles, two silver medals and four bronze medals. Other major teams include the Canadian NEXXICE with two World titles, three silvers and two bronzes, the Russian Team Paradise with three World titles and two bronze medals, the Finnish Team Unique with one gold and one silver, as well as the American teams, Miami University and the Haydenettes with one silver and four bronze medals, respectively. Other medalists include the (now-discontinued) Canadian black ice with one silver medal and two bronze medals, the Canadian Les Suprêmes with one bronze medal.

Although initially dominated by just a handful of teams and countries, the sport has arguably become more competitive over time; as supported by an analysis of the point 'gap' between the 1st and 10th placed teams. Starting from the 2005 WSSC (the first year the current ISU Judging System was introduced), the point 'gap' has tended to decrease over time:

Medalists

Summary

See also
 Synchronized skating
 ISU World Junior Synchronized Skating Championships

References

External links
 
 
 
 
 
 
 
 
 
 
 
 

'
Synchronized skating
Synchronized skating